Stone Brewing (formerly Stone Brewing Co.) is a brewery headquartered in Escondido, California, USA. Founded in 1996 in San Marcos, California, it is the largest brewery in Southern California. Based on 2020 sales volume it is the ninth largest craft brewery in the United States.

The brewery's first beer was Stone Pale Ale, which was considered to be its flagship ale until it was retired in 2015. The company's best known brand is Arrogant Bastard Ale, which has been described as a "watershed beer" that "put San Diego on the craft brew map." Most of Stone's beers are characteristic of west-coast craft brews, meaning that they have a high hop content. Compared to the macro-produced lagers, many Stone brews feature alcohol percentages that are well above average, ranging from 4.8% to 13%.

Stone Brewing is rated as a "world class brewery" by the two largest beer enthusiast websites, RateBeer and BeerAdvocate. Stone Brewing has been voted by the readers of Beer Advocate as the #1 "All Time Top Brewery on Planet Earth."

In June 2022, Stone and Sapporo Breweries announced that they had reached an agreement for Sapporo to purchase Stone Brewing, with the purchase expected to close in August 2022.

History

Stone opened in San Marcos in 1996 at the location currently home to Port Brewing Company and The Lost Abbey. Local designer/illustrator Thomas K. Matthews created the original gargoyle in 1996. He also drew the Arrogant Bastard Ale, Stone Ruination IPA, and Stone Levitation Ale gargoyles, as well as barley and hops motifs.

Since 1999, the company has also operated its own distribution arm called Stone Distributing Company which services Southern California and represents more than 40 craft beer, cider and kombucha brands.

In 2006, Stone relocated from the original brewery to a new, custom-designed facility in Escondido. In 2013, the company opened a packaging hall just south of the brewery which houses the bottling and keg lines. The brewery in Escondido produced 325,645 US beer barrels in 2015. The brewery also houses a Stone Company Store which sells Stone merchandise as well as 1- and 2-liter growlers and 40-ounce and can that can be filled with Stone's year-round beers and special releases.

In May 2013 a second Stone Brewing World Bistro and Gardens opened in the Liberty Station development in the Point Loma neighborhood of San Diego. The  facility cost $8 million and can seat 700 patrons. It is housed in the former mess hall and several other historic buildings of the former Naval Training Center San Diego.

In 2013 Stone opened a location in Terminal 2 of the San Diego International Airport.

In addition to the locations at Escondido and Liberty Station, there are Stone Company Stores in Oceanside, Pasadena, and in San Diego's Little Italy community. The stores sell beer in bottles, kegs and growlers.

In June 2008, Stone Brewing covered the roof of the brewery with solar panels, cutting their energy costs nearly in half.

In Summer 2014, the company announced plans to open Stone Brewing Berlin in the German capital. A 100 hectoliter brewery with onsite can filling in Berlin Mariendorf went into operation in June 2016. At that time, Stone Berlin began distributing Stone IPA and Arrogant Bastard Ale to Austria, the Baltics, Denmark, Finland, France, Ireland, Italy, Netherlands, Northern Ireland, Poland, Spain, Sweden, Switzerland, and the United Kingdom. In 2016 a corner of Stone Brewing Berlin opened as a full restaurant and gardens, Stone Brewing World Bistro & Gardens - Berlin. In April 2019 the entire Stone Brewing - Berlin operation was sold to Scotland-based BrewDog.

On October 8, 2014, sources indicated Stone Brewing had chosen Richmond, VA as the site for its first brewery in the eastern United States. The other two finalists for the brewery were Columbus, Ohio, and Norfolk, VA. Virginia Governor Terry McAuliffe made the formal announcement about the new brewery on October 9, 2014. The brewery held the opening of the Stone Company Store Richmond in March 2016 and began brewing, kegging and bottling Stone IPA in July 2016.

In May 2016, the company announced plans to open a tap room and 10-barrel brewing system in Napa, California, the heart of California's Wine Country. The facility is housed in the historic Borrero building in downtown Napa and opened in May 2018.

On February 12, 2018, Stone filed a lawsuit against MillerCoors, the makers of Keystone beer, alleging that they were attempting to co-opt their name after a brand revamp that emphasizes the word "Stone" on the sides of their products.

Beginning in 2018, Stone's legal representatives systematically alleged trademark infringement against any organization that used the word Stone or Bastard in the name of the company or product. Many of the companies are unrelated to the beer industry. Over 90 objections have been filed to date.

In June 2022, Stone and Sapporo Breweries announced that they had reached an agreement for Sapporo to purchase Stone Brewing for $168 million, with the purchase expected to close in August 2022. The sale did not include Stone Distributing, which is set to become its own independent company.

Locations

 Stone Brewing World Bistro & Gardens – Escondido
 Stone Brewing World Bistro & Gardens – Liberty Station
 Stone Brewing Richmond
 Stone Brewing Tap Room – Oceanside
 Stone Brewing Tap Room – Pasadena
 Stone Brewing Tap Room – Kettner

Awards
Stone has won several awards at major international beer competitions.

See also
Beer in San Diego County, California
Beer in the United States

References

External links

Arrogant Bastard Ale

Beer brewing companies based in San Diego County, California
Companies based in San Diego County, California
Companies established in 1996
Escondido, California